The 2004 Acropolis Rally (formally the 51st Acropolis Rally of Greece) was the sixth round of the 2004 World Rally Championship. The race was held over four days between 3 and 6 June 2004, and was won by Subaru's Petter Solberg, his 7th win in the World Rally Championship.

Background

Entry list

Itinerary
All dates and times are EEST (UTC+3).

Results

Overall

World Rally Cars

Classification

Special stages

Championship standings

Junior World Rally Championship

Classification

Special stages

Championship standings

References

External links 
 Official website of the World Rally Championship

Greece
Acropolis Rally
2004 in Greek sport